Voir is an American television series featuring video essays about cinema. It was produced by Academy Award-nominated director David Fincher and released on Netflix.

Cast
Sasha Stone
Eva Wild as Sasha
Molly Ann Grotha as teen Lisa
Olive Bernadette Hoffman as Lisa
Tony Zhou
Taylor Ramos
Walter Chaw
Drew McWeeny 
David Prior
Glen Keane
Brenda Chapman
Luis Gadea
Jennifer Yuh Nelson
 Lisa Coulthard

Episodes

See also
Every Frame a Painting
The Story of Film: An Odyssey
Los Angeles Plays Itself

References

External links
Voir on IMDb
Official trailer
Official website

2020s American documentary television series
2021 American television series debuts
English-language Netflix original programming
Essays about film
Netflix original documentary television series
Television shows directed by David Prior
Works about films